Bertram John Walsh (born 7 May 1938) is an American mathematician, specializing in locally convex spaces, harmonic analysis, and partial differential equations.

After receiving his bachelor's degree from Aquinas College in Grand Rapids, Walsh received in 1960 his master's degree and in 1963 his PhD from the University of Michigan. His doctoral dissertation Structures of Spectral Measures on Locally Convex Spaces was written under the supervision of Helmut H. Schaefer. In the 1960s Walsh was a member of the mathematics faculty at UCLA. He moved to Rutgers University, where he is now a professor emeritus.

In 1974 he was an Invited Speaker with talk The Theory of Harmonic Spaces at the International Congress of Mathematicians in Vancouver.

Selected publications

References

1938 births
Living people
20th-century American mathematicians
21st-century American mathematicians
Aquinas College (Michigan) alumni
University of Michigan alumni
University of California, Los Angeles faculty
Rutgers University faculty
Operator theorists
Mathematical analysts